Kamil Běhounek (March 29, 1916, Blatná - November 22, 1983, Bonn) was a Bohemian accordionist who played jazz and popular music. He also worked as a bandleader, arranger, composer, and film scorer. He also occasionally played tenor saxophone.

Běhounek was an autodidact on accordion, having learned to play by imitating recordings and BBC broadcasts. He studied law in Prague and began performing in clubs; his first recordings on solo accordion date from 1936. In the late 1930s he worked with the Blue Music Orchestra, Rudolf Antonin Dvorsky, Jiří Traxler, and Karel Vlach. In 1943, he was forcibly compelled by the Nazis to go to Berlin and make arrangements for the bands of Lutz Templin and Ernst van't Hoff. He also played with his own ensemble, including in Bonn and, after 1948, in West Germany for American soldiers' clubs. Between 1968 and 1977 he recorded several albums of folk music, but continued to play swing with his own groups. He also wrote an autobiography, Má láska je jazz (Jazz is my Love), which was published posthumously in 1986.

References
"Kamil Behounek". The New Grove Dictionary of Jazz. 2nd edition, ed. Barry Kernfeld.

Czech jazz musicians
1916 births
1983 deaths
Jazz accordionists
20th-century accordionists
People from Strakonice District
Czechoslovak emigrants to Germany